Knuckle City is a 2019 South African crime sports film written and directed by Jahmil X.T. Qubeka. It was screened in the Contemporary World Cinema section at the 2019 Toronto International Film Festival. It was selected as the South African entry for the Best International Feature Film at the 92nd Academy Awards, but was ultimately not nominated.

Cast
 Bongile Mantsai as Dudu Nyakama
 Sivuyile Ngesi as Goatee
 Nomhle Nkonyeni as Ma Bokwana

Reception

Critical response 

Film critic Anne T. Donahue of Globe and Mail gave the film 3 and half stars out of four, saying, "It is a movie that’s as defined by what one’s heart can endure as much as it is by its mesmerizing sport, its acting and how long it will stay with you. Knuckle City cannot be overlooked." Courtney Small of In The Seats gave it a 4/5 stars and praised the fresh take on traditional genre tropes, saying "Bathed in a sea of poverty and corruption, Knuckle City challenges traditional notions of masculinity to expose how toxic and destructive it is. Spreading like a virus, the sins that the brothers’ inherited from their father are part of a greater systemic problem impacting the township of Mdantsane. Unflinchingly gritty, Knuckle City brings a fresh South African take on traditional genre tropes. Engulfed in beautiful cinematography that is both sweeping and intimate, Qubeka shows that actions to uplift family, and not endanger them, is what real manhood is all about." In 2020 MoJo Global Arts brokered a deal with Showtime (TV network) to air Knuckle City on Showtime.

See also
 List of submissions to the 92nd Academy Awards for Best International Feature Film
 List of South African submissions for the Academy Award for Best International Feature Film
 Cinema of South Africa

References

External links
 

2019 films
2019 crime films
2010s sports films
South African crime films
Xhosa-language films
2010s American films
Hood films
Boxing films